The 1999 Grand Prix was a professional snooker tournament and the second of nine WPBSA ranking events in the 1999/2000 season, following the British Open and preceding the UK Championship. It was held from 11 to 24 October 1999 at the Guild Hall in Preston, England.

Stephen Lee was the defending champion, but he lost his last 32 match against Tony Drago. John Higgins won his 11th ranking title by defeating Mark Williams 9–8 in the final.

Tournament summary 

Defending champion Stephen Lee was the number 1 seed with World Champion Stephen Hendry seeded 2. The remaining places were allocated to players based on the world rankings.

Main draw

Final

Qualifying
Round of 128  Best of 9 frames

 Ian Brumby 5–4 Leigh Griffin 

 Phaitoon Phonbun 5–3 Richard King 

 Nick Dyson 5–0 Shokat Ali 

 Mario Geudens 5–4 Steve Judd 

 Barry Pinches 5–1 Tony Knowles 

 Craig MacGillivray 5–2 Wayne Saidler 

 Mark Selby 5–2 Stephen O'Connor 

 Mark Davis 5–2 Nick Terry 

 Robin Hull 5–1 Tony Jones 

 Dene O'Kane 5–2 Eddie Manning 

 Karl Burrows 5–3 Peter McCullagh 

 Michael Judge 5–0 Paul Sweeny 

 Patrick Delsemme 5–3 Stuart Bingham 

 John Lardner 5–1 Robert Milkins 

 Chris Scanlon 5–3 Hugh Abernethy 

 Darren Clarke 5–1 Mark Bennett 

 Mehmet Husnu 5–3 Nick Pearce 

 David McLellan 5–4 Dennis Taylor 

 Mark Fenton 5–2 Michael Holt 

 Kristján Helgason 5–3 Stefan Mazrocis 

 Munraj Pal 5–2 Karl Broughton 

 Craig Harrison 5–1 Patrick Wallace 

 Wayne Jones 5–3 Wayne Brown 

 Willie Thorne 5–4 James Reynolds 

 Stuart Pettman 5–2 Mike Dunn 

 Lee Richardson 5–4 Troy Shaw 

 Anthony Davies 5–1 Gareth Chilcott 

 Leo Fernandez 5–2 Ryan Day 

 Martin Dziewialtowski 5–1 Adrian Gunnell 

 Ali Carter 5–3 Tony Chappel 

 Noppadon Noppachorn 5–0 Sean Storey 

 Mark Gray 5–4 Stephen Maguire 

Round of 96  Best of 9 frames

 Ian Brumby 5–2 Matthew Couch 

 Gerard Greene 5–2 Phaitoon Phonbun 

 Drew Henry 5–2 Nick Dyson 

 Mario Geudens 5–2 Alfie Burden 

 Barry Pinches 5–1 Paul Davies 

 Jason Ferguson 5–1 Craig MacGillivray 

 Mark Selby 5–4 Ian McCulloch 

 Mark Davis 5–3 Dean Reynolds 

 Paul Wykes 5–2 Robin Hull 

 Dave Finbow 5–4 Dene O'Kane 

 Karl Burrows 5–2 Lee Walker 

 Michael Judge 5–4 Rod Lawler 

 Neal Foulds 5–2 Patrick Delsemme 

 Steve James 5–4 John Lardner 

 Chris Scanlon 5–1 Bradley Jones 

 Darren Clarke 5–1 Nick Walker 

 Jimmy Michie 5–2 Mehmet Husnu 

 David McLellan 5–4 Joe Johnson 

 Mark Fenton 5–2 Martin Clark 

 Kristján Helgason 5–2 Jason Prince 

 Joe Perry 5–1 Munraj Pal 

 Mick Price 5–2 Craig Harrison 

 Wayne Jones 5–4 David Roe 

 Willie Thorne 5–2 Peter Lines 

 Euan Henderson 5–3 Stuart Pettman 

 Marcus Campbell 5–1 Lee Richardson 

 Marco Fu 5–2 Anthony Davies 

 Leo Fernandez w/o–w/d Alain Robidoux 

 Jonathan Birch 5–2 Martin Dziewialtowski 

 Ali Carter 5–2 John Read 

 Noppadon Noppachorn 5–2 David Gray 

 Gary Ponting 5–3 Mark Gray

References

World Open (snooker)
Grand Prix
Grand Prix (snooker)